The 2014–15 SEC women's basketball season began with practices in October 2014, followed by the start of the 2014–15 NCAA Division I women's basketball season in November. Conference play started in early January 2015 and concluded in March, followed by the 2015 SEC women's basketball tournament at the Verizon Arena in North Little Rock, Arkansas.

Preseason

Preseason  All-SEC teams

Coaches select 5 players
Players in bold are choices for SEC Player of the Year

Rankings

SEC regular season

Conference matrix
This table summarizes the head-to-head results between teams in conference play.

Postseason

SEC tournament

  March 4–8, 2015 Southeastern Conference Basketball Tournament, Verizon Arena, North Little Rock, Arkansas

Honors and awards

All-SEC awards and teams

References

 
Southeastern Conference women's basketball seasons